Dioxalin is a reaction product of glycerol with oxalic acid at 533 K.  Its IUPAC name is 5-(hydroxymethyl)-1,4-dioxane-2,3-dione.  Dioxalin readily loses two molecules of carbon dioxide at this high temperature to form allyl alcohol and therefore offers a method for conversion of glycerol to allyl alcohol.

References

Primary alcohols
Lactones
Dioxanes